The Shuswap Indian Reserve is a First Nations reserve in the Columbia Valley region of British Columbia, Canada, located on the left bank of the Columbia River,  north of Invermere.  The reserve is the home reserve of the Shuswap Indian Band, a band government of the Secwepemc (Shuswap) people and a member government of the Shuswap Nation Tribal Council and also of the Ktunaxa Kinbasket Tribal Council in alliance with nearby bands of the Ktunaxa people.

See also
List of Indian Reserves in Canada

References

Columbia Valley
Secwepemc
Indian reserves in British Columbia
British Columbia populated places on the Columbia River